The Foreign Affairs Select Committee is one of many select committees of the British House of Commons, which scrutinises the expenditure, administration and policy of the Foreign, Commonwealth and Development Office.

Inquiries
The Foreign Affairs Committee carries out many inquiries, and publishes a variety of reports, including an annual Human Rights Report. During its inquiry into the government's decision to invade Iraq, Dr. David Kelly famously gave evidence to the committee on 15 July 2003, two days before his death.

In 2015 through 2016 the committee conducted an extensive and highly critical inquiry into the British involvement in the Libyan Civil War. It concluded that the early threat to civilians had been overstated and that the significant Islamist element in the rebel forces had not been recognised, due to an intelligence failure. By summer 2011 the initial limited intervention to protect Libyan civilians had become a policy of regime change. However that new policy did not include proper support and for a new government, leading to a political and economic collapse in Libya and the growth of ISIL in North Africa. The report concluded that the former Prime Minister David Cameron was ultimately responsible for this British policy failure.

Membership
As of January 2023, the Committee's membership is as follows:

Changes since 2019

2017–2019 Parliament
The chair was elected on 12 July 2017, with the members of the committee being announced on 11 September 2017.

Changes 2017–2019

2015–2017 Parliament
The chair was elected on 18 June 2015, with members being announced on 8 July 2015.

Changes 2015–2017

2010–2015 Parliament
The chair was elected on 10 June 2010, with members being announced on 12 July 2010.

Changes 2010–2015

Chairs

See also 
Parliamentary Committees of the United Kingdom

References

External links
Foreign Affairs Committee
Foreign Affairs Committee Members
Former Foreign Affairs Committee Members

Foreign, Commonwealth and Development Office
Select Committees of the British House of Commons
Parliamentary committees on Foreign Affairs